Qadi Kola or Qadi Kala may refer to:
 Qadi Kola, Babol
 Qadi Kola, Qaem Shahr
 Qadi Kola-ye Arateh, Qaem Shahr County
 Qadi Kola-ye Bozorg, Qaem Shahr County
 Qadi Kola, Sari
 Qadi Kola, Chahardangeh, Sari County